An emergency room refers to a department in a medical facility that specializes in the acute care of patients without any prior appointments

Emergency room may also refer to:
 Emergency Room (series), a series of medical simulation video games
 A meeting room used by governments and civil servants for emergency management purposes in times of crisis
 E/R, a 1984-1985 American situation comedy television series 
 ER, a 1994–2009 American medical drama television series
 The Emergency Room, an underground experimental music venue in Vancouver, Canada
 "Emergency Room", an episode in the French animated series, Oggy and the Cockroaches